The 2004 US Open was held between August 30, 2004 – September 12, 2004.

Both Andy Roddick and Justine Henin-Hardenne were unsuccessful in their title defences, Roddick losing in the quarter-finals to Joachim Johansson and Henin-Hardenne falling in the fourth round to Nadia Petrova. On the men's side, Roger Federer won his first US Open, defeating rival and 2001 champion Lleyton Hewitt in a lopsided final. Svetlana Kuznetsova won the women's title defeating Elena Dementieva in the final.

Seniors

Men's singles

 Roger Federer defeated  Lleyton Hewitt, 6–0, 7–6(7–3), 6–0
• It was Federer's 4th career Grand Slam singles title and his 1st title at the US Open. It was Federer's 9th title of the year, and his 20th overall.

Women's singles

 Svetlana Kuznetsova defeated  Elena Dementieva, 6–3, 7–5
• It was Kuznetsova's 1st career Grand Slam singles title.

Men's doubles

 Mark Knowles /  Daniel Nestor defeated  Leander Paes /  David Rikl, 6–3, 6–3
• It was Knowles' 2nd career Grand Slam doubles title and his 1st title at the US Open.
• It was Nestor's 2nd career Grand Slam doubles title and his 1st title at the US Open.

Women's doubles

 Virginia Ruano Pascual /  Paola Suárez defeated  Svetlana Kuznetsova /  Elena Likhovtseva, 6–4, 7–5
• It was Ruano Pascual's 7th career Grand Slam doubles title and her 3rd and last title at the US Open.
• It was Suárez' 7th career Grand Slam doubles title and her 3rd and last title at the US Open.

Mixed doubles

 Vera Zvonareva /  Bob Bryan defeated  Alicia Molik /  Todd Woodbridge, 6–3, 6–4
• It was Zvonareva's 1st career Grand Slam mixed doubles title.
• It was Bryan's 2nd career Grand Slam mixed doubles title and his 2nd (consecutive) title at the US Open.

Juniors

Boys' singles

 Andy Murray defeated  Sergiy Stakhovsky, 6–4, 6–2

Girls' singles

 Michaëlla Krajicek defeated  Jessica Kirkland, 6–1, 6–1

Boys' doubles

 Brendan Evans /  Scott Oudsema defeated  Andreas Beck /  Sebastian Rieschick, 4–6, 6–1, 6–2

Girls' doubles

 Marina Erakovic /  Michaëlla Krajicek defeated  Mădălina Gojnea /  Monica Niculescu, 7–6(7–4), 6–0

Withdrawals

Men's Singles
 James Blake → replaced by  Kristof Vliegen
 Julien Boutter → replaced by  Gilles Elseneer
 Agustín Calleri → replaced by  Kristian Pless
 Guillermo Coria → replaced by  Arnaud Di Pasquale
 Scott Draper → replaced by  Juan Mónaco
 Nicolas Escudé → replaced by  Janko Tipsarević
 Sjeng Schalken → replaced by  Daniel Elsner
 Martin Verkerk → replaced by  Thierry Ascione

Women's Singles
 Kim Clijsters → replaced by  Cara Black 
 Lina Krasnoroutskaya → replaced by  Nuria Llagostera Vives
 Sandrine Testud → replaced by  Camille Pin

References

External links
 Official US Open website

 
 

 
US Open (tennis)
US Open
2004
US Open
US Open
US Open